A sewer dosing unit (SDU) is a plumbing device to allow effective sewage disposal with low liquid-flow rates. With a global emphasis on water saving, many new buildings and renovations are seeing the installation of water saving fixtures such as low flow shower heads and low flush toilets. With the decrease in wastewater flows problems are arising from waste solids not being carried completely to the main sewers, often causing blockages.

History

In 2006, Ducane R&D Pty Ltd conceived the idea of a device that can store wastewater and release it in large batches to replace the drain clearing action of large volume toilet flushes. After prototyping and development the devices became available for sale in Australia, New Zealand and the United Kingdom under the brand name Drainwave in 2010.

Performance

Independent testing has shown that the use of an SDU allows for the use of low flush toilets using as little as 0.8 L to push general waste solids more than 25 metres along a typical wastewater drainpipe. 
An advantage of the SDU is that it can use more than just the toilet wastewater to keep drains clear of blockages.

See also
Water conservation
Water efficiency
Low-flush toilet
GreenPlumbers

External links
Drainwave Website
Drainwave on ABC's New Inventors
Youtube – Drainwave In Action
Jeston Green – Drainwave Helps Avoid ‘Dry Drain’ Problems from Water Efficient Fixtures

Plumbing
Water conservation
Sewerage
Sewerage infrastructure
Sustainable building
Drainage
Water treatment